Bradford railway station may refer to:

In Bradford, Ontario
 Bradford GO Station

In Bradford, England
 Bradford Adolphus Street railway station, a closed station demolished in the 1970s
 Bradford Forster Square railway station, an open station served by Northern and London North Eastern Railway  (historically Bradford Market Street)
 Bradford Interchange, an open station served by Northern and Grand Central (historically Bradford Exchange)